Philip Alan Smith (April 2, 1920 – October 10, 2010) was the seventh bishop of New Hampshire in the Episcopal Church.

Education
Smith was born on April 2, 1920, in Belmont, Massachusetts, the son of Herbert Smith and Elizabeth McDonald. He was educated at Belmont High School after which he enrolled in a B.A course with Harvard University from which he graduated in 1942. During the war, Smith served as an officer with an Army antiaircraft unit in Europe and received the Bronze Star Medal. In 1949 he graduated with a Bachelor of Divinity from Virginia Theological Seminary. Between 1957 and 1958 he studied at St Augustine's College, Canterbury in England. He received his Doctor of Divinity from the Virginia Seminary in 1970.

Ordination
Smith was ordained deacon in June 1949 and priest in December 1949. His first assignment was as curate of  All Saints' Church in Atlanta, Georgia. Between 1952 and 1959 he served as rector of Christ Church in Exeter, New Hampshire and later became assistant professor of pastoral theology at Virginia Theological Seminary. In 1962 he was appointed chaplain of the seminary and in 1967 associate dean of students.

Bishop
Smith was elected Suffragan Bishop of Virginia in 1970 and was consecrated in the Washington National Cathedral by the Presiding Bishop John E. Hines. In 1972 he was elected Bishop of New Hampshire. Smith was involved in the debates concerning the decision of the National Church to ordain women. He was also instrumental in the revision of the Prayer Book, and the production of the 1982 Hymnal. He retired in 1986. Smith died on October 10, 2010, at the Goodwin House retirement in Alexandria, Virginia after complications due to Lung cancer. He was married to Barbara Taylor Smith, who died in 2007, and together had 4 children, one of whom died in infancy.

References

1920 births
2010 deaths
Virginia Theological Seminary alumni
Harvard University alumni
20th-century American Episcopalians
Episcopal bishops of New Hampshire